Melanie Smith may refer to:

Melanie George Smith (born 1972), American politician
Melanie Smith (actress) (born 1962), American actress
Melanie Smith (equestrian) (born 1949), American Olympic equestrian 
Melanie Smith (artist) (born 1965), English artist living in Mexico